The 1987/88 NTFL season was the 67th season of the Northern Territory Football League (NTFL).

St Marys have won there 15th premiership title while defeating the Darwin Buffaloes in the grand final by 61 points.

Grand Final

References

Northern Territory Football League seasons
NTFL